Ion Druţă, also known as Ion Drutse (born 3 September 1928) is a Moldovan writer, poet, playwright and literary historian. He is an honorary member of the Romanian Academy.

Biography
Ion Druţă was born on 3 September 1928 in the village of Horodiște in what was then Soroca County in the Kingdom of Romania (now in Dondușeni District, Republic of Moldova). He graduated from the Forestry School and the Higher Courses of the Institute of Literature "Maxim Gorki" of the Union of Soviet Writers. Since 1969, he has settled in Moscow, Russia.

Druţă's first short stories were published in the early 1950s. His works are considered to be part of the "gold fund" of contemporary national literature.

Appreciations, distinctions, legality
Since 1987, Ion Druţă has served as Honorary President of the Writers' Union of the Republic of Moldova, where he was unanimously elected to the General Assembly of Writers.

Druţă has been the honorary president of the Moldovan Writers' Union since 1987. He initially only wrote in Romanian, but has written in Russian as well since 1960.

Works

Dramatic operas

Novels
 Frunze de dor 
 Povara bunătății noastre  
 Clopotnița
 Întoarcerea țărânii în pământ
 Biserica albă
 Păsările tinereții noastre (1971)
 Sania

In English
 Moldavian Autumn, various translators, University Press of the Pacific (2001)

Awards and honours
 Ordinul Drapelul Roşu de Muncă (1960)
 Ordinul Lenin (1988)
 Ordinul Republicii (1993)
 Laureat al Premiului de Stat al RSS Moldoveneşti pentru romanul “Balade din cîmpie” şi nuvela “Ultima lună de toamnă” (1967).
 Scriitor al Poporului din RSS Moldovenească (1988)
 Membru de Onoare al Academiei Române (1990).
 Membru activ of the Academy of Sciences of Moldova (1992).
 Doctor Honoris Causa of the Moldova State University (1999).
 Laureat al Premiului de Stat al Republicii Moldova în domeniul literaturii (2008)

See also
 Thanksgiving Candle

Gallery

External links
 Druţă's short story The Samaritan Woman of Trezvory in English.
 Ion Druţă (in Romanian)

1928 births
Moldovan writers
Moldovan male writers
Titular members of the Academy of Sciences of Moldova
Honorary members of the Romanian Academy
Recipients of the Order of Lenin
Recipients of the Order of the Republic (Moldova)
Living people
Romanian people of Moldovan descent